New York's 24th State Assembly district is one of the 150 districts in the New York State Assembly in the United States. It has been represented by Democrat David Weprin since 2010.

Geography 
District 24 is located in Queens, comprising the neighborhoods of Richmond Hill and parts of Briarwood, Jamaica Estates, Jamaica Hills, Hollis and Oakland Gardens.

2010s 
District 24 is located in Queens, comprising the neighborhoods of Jamaica Hills and parts of Hollis, Glen Oaks, Richmond Hill, Queens Village, and Jamaica.

Recent election results

2022

2020

2018

2016

2014

2012

2010 special

References 

24